is a Japanese guitarist, composer, and producer. He was born in 1953 in the Shinagawa ward in Tokyo, Japan. Takanaka's music was influential in the city pop genre of the late 1970s and '80s.

Early life 
Takanaka was born to a Chinese father and a Japanese mother. His father came to Japan from Nanjing, China after World War II and married his mother, whose surname was Takanaka.

Takanaka was born in Akabane ward, but moved to Oimachi, Shinagawa ward soon after birth. Masayoshi was naturalized in Japan when he was in the fourth grade of elementary school, and changed his name from Masayoshi Liu to Masayoshi Takanaka.

Career
Masayoshi Takanaka began his professional career in 1971 by playing guitar and bass guitar in the prog rock band Flied Egg under Vertigo. In 1972, Takanaka joined the Sadistic Mika Band. The band fragmented after the divorce of two of its main members, and, in 1976, Takanaka released his first solo album, Seychelles. Throughout the '70s and '80s, Takanaka continued his output, releasing over twenty albums and singles under Kitty Records until 1984 and EMI from 1985 to 2000. In 2000, he formed his own record label, Lagoon Records.

Takanaka is known for his flashy guitars, including a gold colored Fender Stratocaster. He also has a trademark "lagoon-blue" Yamaha SG guitar that he plays during live performances.

He has collaborated with several other musical acts, notably Santana and Roxy Music. 

His 1981 song "Penguin Dancer" was sampled by Grimes on her song "Butterfly" in 2015. His 1979 popular song "Bu - Blue Lagoon" was named the 14th best guitar instrumental by Young Guitar Magazine in 2019.

Discography

Studio albums 

Seychelles (1976)
Takanaka (1977)
An Insatiable High (1977)
Brasilian Skies (1978)
Jolly Jive (1979)
T-Wave (1980)
The Rainbow Goblins (1981)
Alone (1981)
Saudade (1982)
Can I Sing? (1983)
夏・全・開 (Open All Summer) (1984)
Traumatic - Far Eastern Detectives (1985)
Jungle Jane (1986)
Rendez-Vous (1987)
Hot Pepper (1988)
Gaps! (1989)
Nail the Pocket (1990)
Fade to Blue (1992)
Aquaplanet (1993)
Wood Chopper's Ball (1994)
Guitar Wonder (1996)
The White Goblin (1997)
Bahama (1998)
Walkin''' (1999)Hunpluged (2000)Guitar Dream (2001)The Moon Rose (2002)Surf & Turf (2004)Summer Road (2009)Karuizawa Daydream (2010)Ukulele Seychelles (2011)40th Year Rainbow (2011)Takanaka All Time Super Best (2022)

 Selected compilation albums All Of Me (1979)The Lover (1993)Golden Best (2004)

 Live albums Super Takanaka Live! (1980)Ocean Breeze (1982)Rainbow Goblins Story / Live at Budokan (1986)Jungle Jane Tour Live (1986)One Night Gig (1991)Niji Densetsu II - Live at Budokan - Time Machine to the Past (1997)The Man with the Guitar (Recorded at Liveteria) (2001)30th Anniversary Power Live With Friends (2001)Super Studio Live! (2014)

 Instructional albums On Guitar (1978)Little Richard Meets Masayoshi Takanaka'' (1992)

References

External links 
 
 Masayoshi Takanaka's personal blog

1953 births
Living people
Japanese jazz
Japanese rock guitarists
Japanese jazz guitarists
Japanese people of Chinese descent
Musicians from Tokyo
Sadistic Mika Band members